Arthur Veitch (1844 – 1880) was one of a long line of horticulturists who established the renowned family business Veitch Nurseries.

Arthur was the son of James Veitch, Jr., who had established the Chelsea, London branch of the family business. Whilst his brothers, John (1839 – 1870) and Harry (1840 – 1924), were to make significant marks on the history of the English garden, little is recorded about Arthur, and he is conspicuously absent from "Hortus Veitchii", the family history.

He is recorded in the 1871 census as living at 5 Oakfield Street, Chelsea with his wife, Emily. The house had been constructed in the 1860s and the plans were drawn by the architect, George Godwin.

References

External links
Leading Nurseries and Nurserymen in Chelsea (British History on Line) 
 
 

English horticulturists
1844 births
1880 deaths
People from Chelsea, London
Veitch Nurseries